Major General Raymond Oscar "Tubby" Barton (August 22, 1889 – February 27, 1963) was a career officer in the United States Army and combat commander in World War I and World War II. As commander of the 4th Infantry Division during World War II, most notably during the Normandy landings in June 1944, Barton is one of only eleven U.S. Army general officers who commanded their divisions for the duration of their combat service. He commanded the 4th Infantry Division from 3 July 1942 to 26 December 1944 and led them into battle from D-Day at Utah Beach, to the Battle of Normandy, the Liberation of Paris, and into the Battle of Hürtgen Forest before leaving the command due to health problems on December 27, 1944.

Early life and military career

Born on August 22, 1889, Raymond Oscar Barton graduated from the United States Military Academy (USMA) at West Point, New York, with the class of 1912. Many of his West Point classmates later became general officers during World War II as he did, such as Wade H. Haislip, John Shirley Wood, Walton Walker, Harry J. Malony, Walter M. Robertson, William H. Wilbur, Franklin C. Sibert, Robert McGowan Littlejohn, Stephen J. Chamberlin, Archibald Vincent Arnold, Albert E. Brown, Gilbert R. Cook and Millard Harmon.

His first assignment was with the 30th Infantry Regiment, then serving in Alaska. He did not see any active service during World War I but, by now a captain, he served in Germany from 1919 to 1923 as commander of the 1st Battalion, 8th Infantry Regiment which was the last formation to leave Germany.

He later returned to the United States, now as a major, and attended the United States Army Command and General Staff College, along with the United States Army War College. Barton then became a Professor of Military Science and Tactics at Georgetown University. While he was there, on August 1, 1935, he was promoted again, this time to lieutenant colonel.

World War II

The United States entered World War II in December 1941, by which time Barton was a temporary colonel, having been promoted to that rank on February 14.

Having gained for himself a reputation as an excellent trainer of troops, Barton dedicated himself to training the men under his command for their ultimate test, the Allied invasion of Normandy, which would be their baptism of fire. The division conducted training in amphibious landings at Camp Gordon Johnston, Florida, and continued to do so after it left the United States, arriving in January 1944 in England, from where the Allies would launch the invasion, then scheduled for May 1944. Once there, training in amphibious landings continued, most notably at Slapton Sands in Devon.

The Allies' plan for the invasion was for the U.S. VII Corps, under Major General J. Lawton Collins, to seize and hold Utah Beach, with Barton's 4th Division as its spearhead. The division's leading units began landing on Utah Beach early in the morning on June 6, with Barton himself arriving ashore in the afternoon. In contrast to Omaha Beach, where the Germans had put a fierce defense and inflicted heavy casualties on the Americans, Utah saw only light resistance. Despite this, Barton was concerned about getting his men and equipment off of Utah and inland to link up with the American airborne forces which had landed in Normandy in the early hours of the morning (see American airborne landings in Normandy). The terrain behind Utah was flooded, which made the move inland more difficult, and meant that the causeways were the only escape inland. During one point in the afternoon Barton himself began directing traffic through the only open causeway off the beach. His worries were lessened when the Allies opened up other exits.

Barton then began leading his division inland where it relieved troops of the 82nd Airborne Division who had become isolated at Sainte-Mère-Église. In the next few days Barton's division fought to enlarge the Allies' beachhead in Normandy, with the Germans putting up their usual stubborn resistance. A story of this period in the fighting in Normandy tells of Barton visiting a unit of his division to encourage the men. Upon informing them that the Germans opposite them were not first-rate, the unit's intelligence officer countered by stating that the Germans should be put on the distribution list as they apparently did not realize they were second-rate.

During the war he became friends with Ernest Hemingway who sought his favor as the war correspondent assigned to the division and the two corresponded after.

Hemingway wrote to Barton:

During the Battle of Hürtgen Forest on the Weisser Weh stream near Grosshau, Germany General Barton gave up his belt for tourniquet material to medic Russell J. York of his division at York's request. Lives were saved, and a Silver Star was personally awarded to Technician (Medical) 4th Grade York by General Barton for his actions.

Death
Barton died at Fort Gordon near Augusta, Georgia on February 27, 1963, and was buried at Westover Memorial Park.

Popular culture
In the film The Longest Day he is played by Edmond O'Brien. He appears in a scene where he allows his assistant division commander, Theodore Roosevelt Jr. (played by Henry Fonda), to lead the division ashore at D-Day.

References

Bibliography

External links
Generals of World War II
Utah Beach Forces

Recipients of the Legion of Merit
United States Military Academy alumni
Recipients of the Distinguished Service Medal (US Army)
Recipients of the Silver Star
Recipients of the Croix de Guerre (France)
1889 births
1963 deaths
People from Prowers County, Colorado
United States Army Infantry Branch personnel
United States Army personnel of World War I
United States Army generals of World War II
United States Army generals
Military personnel from Colorado
Georgetown University faculty
United States Army War College alumni
United States Army Command and General Staff College alumni